Nurbek Kasenov (born 3 January 1976) is a Kyrgyzstani former boxer. He competed at the 1996 Summer Olympics and the 2000 Summer Olympics.

References

External links
 

1976 births
Living people
Welterweight boxers
Light-middleweight boxers
Kyrgyzstani male boxers
Olympic boxers of Kyrgyzstan
Boxers at the 1996 Summer Olympics
Boxers at the 2000 Summer Olympics
Place of birth missing (living people)
Boxers at the 1998 Asian Games
Asian Games competitors for Kyrgyzstan